Cheshmeh Kabud (also Romanized as Cheshmeh Kabūd; also known as Cheshmeh Kabūd-e Rūtvand, Kānī Kabūd-e Rūtvand, and Rūtvand-e Ardeshīr) is a village in Cheleh Rural District, in the Central District of Gilan-e Gharb County, Kermanshah Province, Iran. At the 2006 census, its population was 89, in 18 families.

References 

Populated places in Gilan-e Gharb County